Jutta Jol (4 February 1896 – 26 October 1981) was a German actress.

Born Justine Jutta Blanda Hermine Gehrmann in Metz, Lothringen German Reich (now, Lorraine, France), she died in Berlin.

Selected filmography
 Lord Reginald's Derby Ride (1924)
 Rosenmontag (1924)
 Vacation from Marriage (1927)
 The Serfs (1928)
 Whirl of Youth (1928)
 The Smuggler's Bride of Mallorca (1929)
 Wellen der Leidenschaft (1930)
 Regine (1935)
 The Yellow Flag (1937)
 Mädchen für alles (1937)
 The Divine Jetta (1937)
 The Tiger of Eschnapur (1938)
 The Indian Tomb (1938)

External links

1896 births
1981 deaths
German film actresses
German silent film actresses
Actors from Metz
20th-century German actresses